Ballyharry is a townland of 224 acres and an area of archaeological sites on Islandmagee, in County Antrim, Northern Ireland, where a number of well-preserved Neolithic house sites have been investigated. The townland is situated in the civil parish of Islandmagee and the historic barony of Belfast Lower.

1996 and 2003 investigations

2004 investigation

See also
List of archaeological sites in County Antrim
List of townlands in County Antrim

References

Archaeological sites in County Antrim
Townlands of County Antrim
Civil parish of Island Magee